George Taylor (born 24 November 1996) is a Scottish former rugby union player who spent his entire professional career playing for Edinburgh Rugby in the United Rugby Championship. Taylor's primary position was centre.

Career

Club
Taylor made his debut for Edinburgh against Munster on 30 November 2018.

International
Taylor received his first call up to the senior Scotland squad in February 2021 for the 2021 Six Nations Championship.

Retirement 
On January 13, 2022, following a long battle with persistent head injuries, Taylor announced his retirement from rugby calling it the "toughest decision" he'd ever had to make. Taylor also stated his ambition to enter into a career in finance.

References

1996 births
People educated at Loretto School, Musselburgh
Living people
Edinburgh Rugby players
Rugby union centres
Rugby union players from Melrose, Scottish Borders
Scottish rugby union players